The following lists events in the year 2018 in Ethiopia.

Incumbents 
 President: Mulatu Teshome
 Prime Minister: Hailemariam Desalegn (until 15 February, care-taker from 15 February to 2 April), Abiy Ahmed Ali (from 2 April)

Events

January
 3 January - Prime Minister Desalegn announces that he will drop charges on political prisoners and close the camp of Maekelawi in effort he claims to "widen the democratic space for all".
 22 January - Seven people die in clashes over the weekend in Woldiya, Amhara Region between security forces and Ethiopian Orthodox worshippers taking part in the ceremony of Timkat.

July
 9 July – Eritrea and Ethiopia officially declare an end to their twenty-year conflict.

August

 11-12 August - Paramilitaries from Somalia reportedly attacked the East Hararghe Zone in Oromia Region, killing at least 40 people.

References 

 
Years of the 21st century in Ethiopia
Ethiopia
Ethiopia
2010s in Ethiopia